Points of View is an outdoor 1991 sculpture by James Surls, installed at Market Square Park in Houston, Texas, in the United States. The abstract sculpture is made of treated pine and painted steel, and measures  x  x . It is mounted on a concrete base that measures  x . The work was dedicated in 1992, following Market Square Park's renovation during 1991–1992.

See also

 1991 in art
 List of public art in Houston

References

1991 establishments in Texas
1991 sculptures
Abstract sculptures in Texas
Outdoor sculptures in Houston
Steel sculptures in Texas
Wooden sculptures in Texas